The Renault Be Bop is a concept car designed by Renault for the 2003 Frankfurt Motor Show.  The name has been recently been re-used for versions of the unrelated Renault Kangoo.

There are two versions of the Be Bop; a sport oriented MPV with a 2.0-litre four-cylinder turbocharged engine producing  and front wheel drive and a SUV version with a smaller 1.6-litre four-cylinder engine producing  from the Renault Mégane with a new six-speed clutchless manual gearbox and an electronic coupling system linking the front and rear wheels. The two variations share 50% of their body components.

References

External links
Renault Concept Cars official website

Be Bop